Alfred Cowles Sr. (1832–1889) was an American businessperson and newspaper publisher. During the 1860s to 1880s he was a bookkeeper, treasurer, and business manager of the Chicago Tribune of which he was part owner.

Biography
Alfred Cowles was born in Mantua, Ohio on May 13, 1832. His parents were Edwin Weed and Almira Mills Cowles. Another son, Edwin Jr. (1825–1890), became publisher of The Cleveland Leader newspaper. Edwin married Elizabeth Hutchinson and had two sons: Alfred Hutchinson Cowles and Eugene Hutchinson Cowles (1855–1892).

Alfred Cowles married Sarah Frances Hutchinson, who was born in 1837 in Cayuga, New York. She was the daughter of Moseley and Elizabeth Hutchinson. They had four children: Edwin (1861–1861), Alfred Jr. (1865–1939), Sarah Frances (1862–1920), and William Hutchinson (1866–1947). William Hutchinson Cowles Sr., who was married to Harriet Bowen Cheney, became a newspaper publisher in Spokane, Washington.

Vassar College has a scholarship named for Sarah Frances Hutchinson Cowles, and the University of Chicago may still have a fellowship named for her.

Alfred Cowles died in Chicago on December 20, 1889. He is interred at Oak Woods Cemetery.

See also 

 Cowles Publishing Company

Notes 

American newspaper chain founders
19th-century American newspaper publishers (people)
Businesspeople from Chicago
Businesspeople from Cleveland
1832 births
1889 deaths
19th-century American journalists
Cowles family
American male journalists
19th-century American male writers